The  is a bus company company that operates within Osaka, in southern Kyoto, and Ōtsu. It is a subsidiary of the Keihan Group, which also runs Keihan Electric Railway.

History 

Keihan Bus Company was established on 22 July 1922 as a taxi company called Momoyama Motor Co.,Ltd.(桃山自動車株式会社). In 1924 it became a subsidiary of Keihan, which runs the Keihan Electric Railway. It later merged with other transportation companies, including Daigo Kisen and Jōhoku Motor Co. in 1930, and Keihan-Uji Kotsu and Keihan Uji Kotsu Tanabe in 2006. As a result of these mergers, Keihan Bus has acquired an extensive service area in Osaka, Kyoto and Shiga Prefecture.

Local bus services

Offices 
Keihan Bus offices attached to garages include:
 Ōtsu Office: There are route buses which run with Kōjaku Railway.
 Yamashina Office
 Rakunan Office: There are route buses which run with Nara Kotsu.
 Kyotanabe Office
 Otokoyama Office: There are route buses which run with Hankyu Bus.
 Hirakata Office
 Koridanchi Office
 Takatsuki Office
 Katano Office
 Neyagawa Office
 Kadoma Office

Information desks 
Information desks are known as "K-bit" (the abbreviation for the Keihan-bus Information & Tickets)
 Ōtsu Station Desk
 Ishiyama Station Desk☆
 Yamashina Station Desk☆
 Sanjo-Keihan Station Desk
 Kyoto Station Karasuma Exit Desk (sells only highway bus tickets)
 Kyoto Station Hachijo Exit Desk（sells only highway bus and sightseeing bus tickets）
 Hirakatashi Station Desk☆
 Korien Station Desk
 Neyagawashi Station Desk☆
 Moriguchishi Station Desk☆

Temporary sales offices 
These type desks open at the beginning and end of each month.
 Hoshida Station Desk
 Rokujizo Station Desk
 Takatsukishi Station Desk

Bus terminals 
 Enryaku-ji Bus Terminal
 Daigo Bus Terminal

Subsidiary companies

Keihan Kyoto Kotsu

The  is a bus company within the Keihan Group, established in April 2005 by splitting from Keihan Bus. Its service areas are in the northwest of Kyoto.

References

External links

 Official Website

Bus
Transport in Kyoto Prefecture
Transport in Osaka Prefecture
Transport in Shiga Prefecture
Bus companies of Japan
Japanese companies established in 1922